Tales of Maj'Eyal is an open-source roguelike video game released for Microsoft Windows, Mac OS X, and Linux in 2012. Tales of Maj'Eyal is available as donation-supported freeware (donationware) from the developers; donations grant some exclusive online features as part of a freemium model. The game may also be purchased through the digital distribution outlets Steam or GOG. The game's TE4 game engine source code is under a GNU GPLv3 license, while the game's assets are licensed for use "with the Tales of Maj'Eyal game only."

Gameplay
Tales of Maj'Eyal is a dungeon crawl featuring a customizable graphical interface that integrates classic roguelike keyboard commands with a mouse-driven interface. In a departure from many older roguelike games, Tales of Maj'Eyal has full-color graphics, can be played almost exclusively with the mouse, and despite permadeath the player can earn extra lives through various ways and by leveling up.

Tales of Maj'Eyal emphasizes tactical turn-based combat and flexible player-controlled character development. Gameplay depends heavily on the player's decisions and ability to develop and execute strategy. Play begins with the player selecting one of nine races and one of 25 classes (expandable with add-ons). Not all character choices are available at first; some must be unlocked through in-game progress, or through monetary donation or purchase.

The player explores the lore-filled world of Eyal, which contains numerous dungeons and adversaries. The plot is non-linear, and success depends as much on character planning and storyline choices as it does on the player's skill in defeating enemies in combat.

Online support
Players may register with an optional online game server, which allows them to view their characters, achievements and high scores. It also collates game statistics including the top killers of players, most common race/class choices, and number of wins. In addition, the game server offers an online chat system, letting players talk to each other.

Development 
Tales of Maj'Eyal was developed by Nicolas Casalini ("DarkGod"), with graphics by Assen Kanev ("Rexorcorum") and Raymond Gaustadnes ("Shockbolt"). It is based upon Casalini's earlier game Tales of Middle Earth (ToME) which in turn is based upon his own PernAngband variant, itself based on Zangband, which in turn was based on Angband. Development of ToME 4 started in 2009, and the first formal release occurred in 2012.

The T-Engine game engine is written in C, and offers a development framework for grid-based game modules written in Lua. It supports many OpenGL features such as particle effects and shaders. The T-Engine has been used to create games for the annual Seven Day Roguelike Challenge in 2011 and 2012.

Several expansions have been released. Ashes of Urh'Rok was released on 27 October 2014, Embers of Rage on 23 February 2016, and Forbidden Cults on 16 May 2018.

Modifications may also be made to the Tales of Maj'Eyal game module through an add-on system, including graphics, interface, content and gameplay balance alterations and additions.

Reception 
Tales of Maj'Eyal was awarded "ASCII Dreams Roguelike of the Year" for 2010 2011, and 2012, with over 5,000 roguelike players voting in 2012. It has also been accepted into Valve's Steam store as well as on the DRM-free outlet gog.com. In 2016, Steamspy reported over 150,000 Steam game owners and around 2,000 active players over the previous two weeks.

Reviews of Tales of Maj'Eyal have been largely positive, with praise for its accessibility, graphics, user interface, backstory and varied gameplay. US Gamer called it "one of the very best roguelikes out there". Linux Journal wrote "all the great games tend to have a horribly steep learning curve, and all the simple games seem to involve crushing candy. Thankfully, there are a few games like Tales of Maj'Eyal that are complex but with a really easy learning curve." The game has a 95% positive rating on Steam, earning the coveted ranking of "Overwhelmingly Positive".

See also
 List of open-source games

References

External links 
 
 git.net-core.org/tome/t-engine4 repository of the game's open-source engine

Windows games
Linux games
MacOS games
Roguelike video games
Lua (programming language)-scripted video games
Open-source video games
Commercial video games with freely available source code
2012 video games
Steam Greenlight games
Video games with Steam Workshop support
Video games developed in France
Video games using procedural generation